The Promised Land ( / Обећана земља) is a Yugoslav film directed by Veljko Bulajić. It was released in 1986.

External links
 

1986 films
Croatian drama films
1980s Croatian-language films
Yugoslav drama films
Films directed by Veljko Bulajić